Gaither House may refer to:

Dr. Nathan Gaither House, Columbia, Kentucky, listed on the NRHP in Adair County, Kentucky
 Gaither House (Harmony, North Carolina), listed on the NRHP in North Carolina
 Gaither House (Morganton, North Carolina), listed on the NRHP in Burke County, North Carolina